Officium Novum is an album by Norwegian saxophonist Jan Garbarek and the Hilliard Ensemble recorded in Austria in 2009 and released on the ECM label. The album is a sequel to their previous collaboration Officium (1994).

Reception 

The Allmusic review by Stephen Eddins states "Like the first album, this one is suffused with a sense of distant mystery and a profound, powerful melancholy that is given voice with intense feeling. The sound again is spacious and warmly resonant, with an earthy, enveloping ambience. This album will be a must-have for anyone who loved the first one, and it should appeal to any listener with an affinity for meditative Eastern European spirituality, especially when tied to contemporary expressivity and stylistic freedom".

Track listing
All compositions by Jan Garbarek except as indicated
 "Ov Zarmanali" (Komitas) - 4:11   
 "Svjete Tihij" (Traditional) - 4:14   
 "Allting Finns" - 4:18   
 "Litany: Litany/Otche Nash/Otche Nash" (Nikolai N. Kedrov/Traditional/Anonymous) - 13:06   
 "Surb, Surb" (Komitas) - 6:40   
 "Most Holy Mother of God" (Arvo Pärt) - 4:34   
 "Tres Morillas M’enamoran" (Anonymous) - 3:32   
 "Sirt Im Sasani" (Komitas) - 4:06   
 "Hays Hark Nviranats Ukhti" (Komitas) - 6:25   
 "Alleluia Nativitas" (Pérotin) - 5:20   
 "We Are the Stars" - 4:09   
 "Nur Ein Weniges Noch" (Giorgos Seferis) - 0:19

Personnel
 Jan Garbarek - soprano saxophone, tenor saxophone
 The Hilliard Ensemble 
 David James - countertenor
 Rogers Covey-Crump - tenor
 Steven Harrold - tenor
 Gordon Jones - baritone

References

ECM Records albums
Jan Garbarek albums
Hilliard Ensemble albums
2010 albums
Albums produced by Manfred Eicher